= Marijuana Tank =

Reservoir in New Mexico

Coordinates: 32.39988°N 107.11626°W

Marijuana Tank was a reservoir in the U.S. state of New Mexico. It is currently dry. It is apparently the only entry in the federal Geographic Names Information System database with the word "marijuana" in its name.
